Bay rum is a type of cologne and aftershave lotion.
Other uses include as under-arm deodorant and as a fragrance for shaving soap, as well as a general astringent.

Origins
It is a distillate that was originally made in Saint Thomas "and probably other West Indian islands" from rum and the leaves and/or berries of the West Indian bay tree, Pimenta racemosa.

John Maisch identified the leaf in the herbarium at the Philadelphia Academy of Natural Sciences, collected in Saint Croix, "by the late Dr. Griffith", which was identified as Myrcia acris, now transferred to the genus Pimenta. Maisch added that it was "very probable that various species are made use of for the same purpose." According to an 1889 reference, other ingredients may be citrus and spice oils, the most common being lime oil and oil of cloves. A drop of oil of cloves is added to two parts bay oil and one part pimento oil in one of two recipes for bay rum; the aromatics are steeped in alcohol and as a last step an equal part of "good rum" is added, and cinnamon.

Popularity

It was first made fashionable in New York and other American cities before it was available in Europe. This Rexall bay rum example (pictured) from the Prohibition era in the United States was labeled "for external use only", but with 58% grain alcohol it was often used as a legal, if somewhat toxic, source of beverage alcohol. A 1933 recording by Ashley & Foster references drinking bay rum purchased from the Raylass Chain department store in Gastonia, North Carolina.

Products
Proprietary bay rum lotions are produced by labs in several West Indian countries, as well as American and European fragrance companies. The original bay rum from St. Thomas by A. H. Riise continues to be produced locally in the US Virgin Islands by the West Indies Bay Company.

The bay laurel, the "bay leaves" in common culinary use, are from a completely unrelated species, Laurus nobilis, and not the West Indian bay tree. Bay laurel can be used to produce a similar, although not identical, product.

References

Perfumes